Timothy Alan Barrenger (born 15 October 1940) is a former Australian politician. Born in Launceston, he was a Liberal member for Bass in the Tasmanian House of Assembly from 1969 until his retirement in 1972.

References

1940 births
Living people
Liberal Party of Australia members of the Parliament of Tasmania
Members of the Tasmanian House of Assembly